The Fasci Siciliani , short for Fasci Siciliani dei Lavoratori (Sicilian Workers Leagues), were a popular movement of democratic and socialist inspiration, which arose in Sicily in the years between 1889 and 1894. The Fasci gained the support of the poorest and most exploited classes of the island by channeling their frustration and discontent into a coherent programme based on the establishment of new rights. Consisting of a jumble of traditionalist sentiment, religiosity, and socialist consciousness, the movement reached its apex in the summer of 1893, when new conditions were presented to the landowners and mine owners of Sicily concerning the renewal of sharecropping and rental contracts.

Upon the rejection of these conditions, there was an outburst of strikes that rapidly spread throughout the island, and was marked by violent social conflict, almost rising to the point of insurrection. The leaders of the movement were not able to keep the situation from getting out of control. The proprietors and landowners asked the government to intervene, and Prime Minister Francesco Crispi declared a state of emergency in January 1894, dissolving the organizations, arresting its leaders and restoring order through the use of extreme force. Some reforms followed, including workmen's compensation and pension schemes. The suppression of the strikes also led to an increase in emigration.

Characteristics
The Fasci movement was made up of a federation of scores of associations that developed among farm workers, tenant farmers, and small sharecroppers as well as artisans, intellectuals, and industrial workers. The immediate demands of the movement were fair land rents, higher wages, lower local taxes and distribution of misappropriated common land. Between 1889 and 1893 some 170 Fasci were established in Sicily. According to some sources the movement reached a membership of more than 300,000 by the end of 1893. The Fasci constituted autonomous organizations with their own insignia (red rosettes), uniforms and sometimes even musical bands, and their own local halls for reunions and congresses. They were called Fasci (Fascio literally means bundle) because everyone can break a single stick, but no one can break a bundle of sticks.

While many of the leaders were of socialist or anarchist leanings, few of their supporters were revolutionaries. Nevertheless, the peasants who assembled into the Fasci were eager for social justice and convinced that a new world was about to be born. A crucifix hung beside the red flag in many of their meeting-places, and portraits of the King beside those of the revolutionaries Garibaldi, Mazzini and Marx. Cheers for the King were often heard in their marches that almost resembled quasi-religious processions. Many of the Fasci were part of the Italian Workers' Party (Partito dei Lavoratori Italiani, the initial name of the Italian Socialist Party) that had been founded at a conference in Genoa on August 14, 1892.

The rural Fasci in particular were a curious phenomenon: both ancient and modern. They combined millenarian aspirations with urban intellectual leadership often in contact with workers’ organizations and ideas in the more industrialized Northern Italy. According to the Marxist historian Eric Hobsbawm, the Fasci were millenarian insofar as the socialism preached by the movement was seen by the Sicilian peasantry as a new religion, the true religion of Christ – betrayed by the priests, who were on the side of the rich – that foretold the dawn of a new world, without poverty, hunger and cold, in accordance with God’s will. The Fasci, which included many women, were encouraged by the messianic belief that the start of a new reign of justice was looming and the movement spread like an epidemic.

Foundation and rapid growth
The Fasci were the result of the revolt of the Sicilian peasants against the introduction of capitalist relationships into the rural economy aggravated by the world depression in agriculture of the 1880s.  The agrarian crisis between 1888 and 1892 led to a steep decrease in wheat prices. The island’s main sources of wealth – wine, fruit and sulphur – suffered a heavy blow. The dominant landowning class channeled most of the economic burden on to the peasantry, in the form of higher rents and discriminatory local taxation. As social tension rose, a handful of young and hitherto quite unknown socialist intellectuals – many of them recent graduates of Palermo University – seized their opportunity. The movement grew under the first government of Prime minister Francesco Crispi (1887–1891) and coincided with unpopular tax increases and ratification of a series of laws curtailing personal freedom. The Italian economy had been sliding into a deep recession since the late 1880s. New protective tariffs had been introduced in 1887 on agricultural and industrial goods, followed by a trade war with France, which badly damaged Italian commerce and affected Italy’s agricultural exports, the only potentially dynamic economic sector of Southern Italy. Many farmers suffered severely.

The first official Fascio was founded on May 1 (Labour Day), 1891, in Catania by Giuseppe de Felice Giuffrida. (An earlier Fascio was set up in Messina on March 18, 1889, but was dormant after its founder, Nicola Petrina, was arrested in July of that year and not released until 1892. Another reason why the first Fascio of Messina – formed after the example of the Fasci operai [Workers leagues] constituted in Central and North Italy from 1871 – did not develop was that it brought together not individual workers but the workers' associations of the city, which retained their independence, their status and economic orientation.) Other leaders included Rosario Garibaldi Bosco in Palermo, Nicola Barbato in Piana dei Greci, Bernardino Verro in Corleone, and Lorenzo Panepinto in Santo Stefano Quisquina. While the ruling elite depicted the men of the Fasci as treasonous socialists, communists and anarchists seeking to overthrow the monarchy; in fact many were devout Catholics and monarchists. The movement sometimes had a messianic nature, characterised by statements such as "Jesus was a true socialist and wanted just what the Fasci were demanding." Nicola Barbato was known as "the workers' apostle."

The keenest socialist among the Fasci leaders was Garibaldi Bosco. In August 1892, he attended the Socialist Party’s congress at Genoa and on his return obediently purged his fascio of its anarchist and other non-socialist members. His ideal of a united democratic front was shared by the father of Sicilian socialism, Napoleone Colajanni. The leader in Catania, De Felice, also maintained contact with leading anarchists like Amilcare Cipriani. On these and other important issues there was much friction between Catania and Palermo.

Crispi was replaced as prime minister by Antonio Di Rudinì in February 1891, who was succeeded by Giovanni Giolitti in May 1892. On January 20, 1893, when peasants of Caltavuturo occupied communal land that they claimed was theirs, local authorities killed 13 and wounded 21 in the Caltavuturo massacre. Disturbances continued throughout the year. The Fasci started out as urban movements, animated by artisans, which evolved into a more popular and combative mass movement with the adherence of sulphur miners, and in a later stage with the involvement of peasants and sharecroppers. In the autumn of 1893, labour conflicts in the cities and the mines came together with the protests and claims of the farmers. The movement reached its greatest breadth in the manifestations against taxes, involving the lowest tiers of the city and the countryside, becoming difficult, if not impossible, to control by its leaders.

Initial success
From its initial origins in Eastern Sicily, especially in Catania, the movement got its real impetus with the establishment of the Fascio of Palermo on June 29, 1892. The Leagues rapidly radiated over all Sicily. In the spring of 1893 the leaders of the movement decided to carry their propaganda to the peasants and miners of the countryside. Between March and October the number of fasci grew from 35 to 162 with more than 200,000 members. From that moment on the dynamics of the movement started to change; no longer the workers and craftsmen in the urban centres, but rather the peasants became the driving force behind the organisation. The centre of gravity moved from the city to the countryside.

On May 21–22, 1893, a congress was held in Palermo attended by 500 delegates from nearly 90 leagues and socialist circles. A Central Committee was elected, composed of nine members: Giacomo Montalto for the province of Trapani, Nicola Petrina for the province of Messina, Giuseppe De Felice Giuffrida for the province of Catania, Luigi Leone for the province of Siracusa, Antonio Licata for the province of Agrigento, Agostino Lo Piano Pomar for the province of Caltanissetta, Rosario Garibaldi Bosco, Nicola Barbato and Bernardino Verro for the province of Palermo. The Congress decided that all Leagues were obliged to join the Italian Workers' Party (Partito dei Lavoratori Italiani), the predecessor of the PSI.

In July 1893 a peasant conference at Corleone drafted model agrarian contracts for labourers, sharecroppers and tenants and presented them to the landowners. When those refused to negotiate, a strike against landowners and against state taxes broke out over a large part of western Sicily. The so-called Patti di Corleone (Corleone Covenants), are considered by historians to be the first trade union collective contract in capitalist Italy. In September, the state authorities intervened and some of the landowners were persuaded to capitulate. Elsewhere the strike continued until November 1893. Railwaymen of Catania and Palermo, the sulphur-miners and many other workers followed their example winning higher wages or better working conditions.

In October 1893, a congress of miners was held in Grotte in the Province of Agrigento which was attended by some 1,500 people, including workers and small producers. The miners demanded that the minimum age to be raised to 14 years for those who worked in the sulfur mines, the decrease of working hours and setting a minimum wage. Small producers demanded measures to avoid exploitation by large owners. The minimum-age measure was meant to improve the situation for the carusi, minors that worked in conditions of near-slavery that sparked public outrage and inspired many complaints.

The successful struggle convinced the Sicilian ruling elite that the "upheaval" had to be stopped. They were seized by panic and some even demanded the closing of all schools to halt the spread of subversive doctrines. Prefects and frightened local councils bombarded Rome with requests for the immediate suppression of the Fasci. Despite the heavy pressure from the King, the army and conservative circles in Rome, however, Giolitti would neither treat strikes – which were not illegal – as a crime nor dissolve the Fasci nor authorise the use of firearms against popular demonstrations. His policy was “to allow these economic struggles to resolve themselves through amelioration of the condition of the workers” and not to interfere in the process.

Rising tensions

Nonetheless, Giolitti acknowledged the need to stifle the agitation. From May 1893 onwards, leaders of the Fasci were arrested occasionally and police and military reinforcements were sent to Sicily. In the autumn of 1893 the leadership lost control over the Fasci and the popular agitation got out of hand. Peasant squatters seized land, violent crowds demonstrated for work and against local misgovernment, tax offices were burnt down and clashes with the police grew more frequent and bloody. The violent social conflict almost rose to the point of insurrection. The proprietors and landowners asked the government to intervene.

However, his attitude could not be maintained. Landowners were infuriated by the unwillingness of the government to use force, while the peasants were annoyed by the unwillingness to redistribute land from the latifundia. Landowners matched the strike with a lockout, and many peasants, probably a majority in the strike centres, were left without tenancies when the planting season ended in mid-December. In December 1893, the failure of the Giolitti government to restore public order gave rise to a general demand that Crispi should return to power. Giolitti had to resign on November 24, 1893, as a result of the Banca Romana scandal.

In addition to the unrest in Sicily, a wave of rioting spread through Italy in August 1893, triggered by the killing of a number of migrant workers in the salt pans of Aigues Mortes in southern France escalated into a more generalized working-class revolt supported by anarchists and violent riots in Rome and Naples. Italy seemed to be slipping to a revolution. By the time Crispi returned to power in December 1893, Italy appeared to many to be on the brink of collapse. Crispi promised important measures of land reform for the near future. He was not blind to the misery and the need for social reform. Before 1891 he had been the patron of the Sicilian working-class and many of their associations had been named after him. Colajanni, the chief architect of Giolitti’s fall by exposing the Banca Romana scandal, was first offered the Ministry of Agriculture, which he refused, then sent to Sicily on a mission of appeasement.

Crispi’s good intentions got lost in the outcry for strong measures. In the three weeks of uncertainty before the government was formed, the rapid spread of violence drove many local authorities to defy Giolitti’s ban on the use of firearms. In December 1893, 92 peasants lost their lives in clashes with the police and army. Government building were burned as well as flour mills and bakeries that refused to lower their prices when taxes were lowered or abolished. Eleven people were killed on December 10, 1893, in Giardinello after a rally that asked for the abolition of taxes on food and disbandment of the local field guards (guardie campestri). The protestors carried the portrait of the King taken from the municipality and burned tax files. On December 17, 1893, many people were wounded when troops fired on a manifestation in Monreale. Another 11 protestors were killed in Lercara Friddi on December 25. On January 1, 1894, 20 people were killed and many wounded in Gibellina and Pietraperzia. On January 2, there two dead in Belmonte Mezzagno and the next day 18 dead and many wounded in Marineo. Two days after, on January 5, thirteen dead and many wounded closed the series in Santa Caterina.

The disorders were not the product of a revolutionary plot, but Crispi chose to believe otherwise. On the basis of dubious documents and reports, Crispi claimed that there was an organised conspiracy to separate Sicily from Italy; the leaders of the Fasci conspired with the clerics and were financed by French gold, and war and invasion were looming.

Crackdown
On January 3, 1894, Crispi declared a state of siege throughout Sicily. Army reservists were recalled and General Roberto Morra di Lavriano was dispatched with 40,000 troops. The old order was restored through the use of extreme force, including summary executions. The Fasci were outlawed, the army and the police killed scores of protesters, and wounded hundreds. Thousands of militants, including all the leaders, were put in jail or sent into internal exile. Some 1,000 persons were deported to the penal islands without trial. All working-class societies and cooperatives were dissolved and the freedom of the press, meeting and association were suspended. A solidarity revolt of anarchists and republicans in the Lunigiana was crushed as well. The government also seized the opportunity to 'revise' the electoral registers. In Catania 5,000 of the 9,000 electors were struck off.

In the early days of January, 1894 a meeting of the Central Committee of the Fasci took place in Palermo to discuss the position of the movement. Two sharply contrasting positions emerged. De Felice Giuffrida, known for his anarchist tendencies, supported the need to take advantage of the situation of unrest to provoke a revolution on the island. However, the majority took an opposite view, arguing the need to proceed peacefully. A revolt was not only inappropriate, but it would be detrimental to the movement. The meeting condemned the violent incidents in various parts of the island, and launched an appeal to stay calm and not to retaliate. In the end De Felice Giuffrida accepted the position of the majority. But the die was cast for the authorities to arrest De Felice, Montalto, Petrina, and others. Garibaldi Bosco, Barbato and Verro were arrested on board the steamship Bagnara that was about to leave for Tunis.

On February 28, 1894, Crispi presented the "evidence" for a widespread conspiracy in parliament: the so-called "International Treaty of Bisacquino", signed by the French Government, the Czar of Russia, Giuseppe De Felice, the anarchists and the Vatican, with the goal to detach Sicily from the rest of the country and put it under a Franco-Russian protectorate. The Radical deputy Felice Cavallotti ridiculed the conspiracy of Crispi, poking fun at "the famous treaty between the Emperor of Russia, the President of the French Republic, and Mr De Felice". The so-called "Treaty of Bisacquino" was so named not because it was signed in the Sicilian town, but because it had been invented by the Director of Public Safety of Bisacquino, the Neapolitan Sessi.

Trial in Palermo

The trials of the central committee of the Fasci, that took place in Palermo in April and May 1894, were the final blow to the movement. In spite of an eloquent defence, which turned the Court into a political platform and thrilled every socialist in the country, they were condemned to heavy sentences of imprisonment. On May 30, 1894, the leaders of the movement received their sentence: Giuseppe de Felice Giuffrida to 18 years and Rosario Bosco, Nicola Barbato and Bernardino Verro to 12 years in jail.

“In front of you,” Barbato told the judges, “we provided the documents and evidence of our innocence. My friends thought it necessary to support their defence legally; I will not do so. Not because I have no confidence in you, but it is the law that does not concern me. So I do not defend myself. You have to sentence: we are the elements that destroy your sacred institutions. You have to sentence: it is logical, human. I will always pay tribute to your loyalty. But we say to our friends outside: do not ask for pardon, do not ask for amnesty. Socialist civilization should not begin with an act of cowardice. We demand a condemnation, we do not ask for mercy. Martyrs are more useful to the holy cause than any propaganda. Condemn us!” 

The heavy sentence aroused strong reactions in Italy and in the United States. In Palermo, a group of students went to the Teatro Bellini and asked the orchestra to perform the hymn of Garibaldi. And the theatre applauded. In March 1896, after Crispi had to resign due to the humiliating defeat of the Italian army at Battle of Adwa in Ethiopia during First Italo-Ethiopian War, the new government under Prime Minister Antonio Di Rudinì recognized the excessive brutality of the repression. Many Fasci members were pardoned and released from jail. Di Rudinì made it clear though that a reorganization of the Fasci would not be tolerated. After their release, De Felice, Barbato and Bosco were met by a large crowd of supporters in Rome, who released the horses form their carriage and dragged them to the hotel, cheering for socialism and denouncing Crispi.

Aftermath

The brutal repression backfired to some extent. The Fasci leaders used the military tribunals to make impassioned and well-reported speeches in their defence. The tribunals were too repressive and revolted the Liberal consciences of many Northern Italians. In an attempt to regain his former 'left wing', Crispi introduced a bill in July 1894 to take over large estates and uncultivated land. The idea was to rent out the land on long leases in medium-sized holdings and leaseholders would be given reduced credit and tax concessions. While the bill failed to convince the Radicals and democrats of Crispi's good intentions, it angered the Sicilian landowners. After the suppression of the Fasci those were now unwilling to make any concessions. Under the leadership of Di Rudiní, they battled against the bill. When Crispi fell from power after Adwa in March 1896, their proponent Di Rudiní became Prime Minister and the Sicilian landowners were safe.

Nevertheless, the revolt inspired social reforms. In 1898, two measures of social legislation were passed by the minister of the treasury of Di Rudini’s cabinet, Luigi Luzzatti. The industrial workmen’s compensation scheme from 1883 was made obligatory with the employer bearing all costs; and a voluntary fund for contributory disability and old age pensions was created.

Many former adherents of the Fasci left Sicily. Life had grown hard and employment difficult to find because of their involvement with the movement. For those in Sicily who wanted to change their life for the better in those days, there were only two alternatives: rebel or emigrate. After the failure of the rebellion many peasants had no choice but to vote with their feet and opted for emigration. Others remained, and a year later, in 1895, protests against unjust taxes and about the issue of communal land resumed in many towns in Sicily. The disbandment of troop had to be postponed.

According to Hobsbawm, the Fasci were a prime example of primitive agrarian movement that became modern by aligning itself with socialism and communism. Many of its leaders continued in the Socialist Party and continued the struggle for land rights and land reform once they were released. Despite the 1894 defeat, permanent movements were set up in some areas of Sicily using modern socialist models of organisation.

With the dissolution of the Fasci, the unrest on Sicily did not subside. In January 1898, peasants demanding work and bread ransacked the town hall in Siculiana. In the fall of 1901, Sicilian peasants – following the example of numerous agrarian strikes that were affecting the whole of Italy – again set off a wave of agrarian unrest, conscious of the fact that in a way they resumed "the march abruptly interrupted in 1894 by the repression of the Fasci." Just as the Fasci movement, one of the main goals of the 1901 strikes and was a revision of the land leases to undermine the economic power of the gabellotti. After the First World War the communist movement In Sicily built on the incipient organisational structures of the Fasci, such as during the Biennio Rosso. The Fasci inspired social struggle in Sicily well into the 1950s.

The role of women
The role of women in the Fasci Siciliani was substantial, but is regularly overlooked in historical accounts. Women were often at the forefront of demonstrations and strikes, speaking in public meetings and conferences. During municipal elections they made sure that men were going to vote (women did not have the right to vote at the time). They patrolled the taverns to prevent the men from betraying the duty of militancy with bottles of wine. They also took care of many organizational aspects and were particularly active in proselytizing for the movement, decorating the stage of the rallies, preparing ceremonies such as the inauguration opening of the flag of the Fasci, and welcoming the leaders who came to the towns with flowers.

Women were among the most ardent. In some municipalities the women organized themselves into women's sections and in others even in exclusively female Fasci. The strongest and most numerous presence of women was in the Fascio of Piana degli Albanesi, where over a thousand of the 3,500 members were women in a town of 9,000 inhabitants. The female Fascio delle lavoratrici had their own meeting hall where they held their own meetings; they carried their own banner when participating in protest marches. For the Fasci the women abandoned the Church, but not the religious sentiment, to protest against the priests, who had tried to frighten them and isolate them with the threat of excommunication. In Piana the women organised a boycott of annual religious procession in protest of the priest’s opposition to the movement in 1893.

At the congress in Palermo in May 1893 where the union of all the Fasci in Sicily was decided, Maria Cammarata, of the Fascio of Piana, urged the audience to ensure the registration of women. The presence and political sophistication of the female representatives at the congress surprised the editor of  the Giornale di Sicilia: "I could not believe it myself. They spoke loudly and clearly, with ease and astonishing courage." One of the most prominent women was Marietta De Felice Giuffrida, the daughter of Giuseppe de Felice Giuffrida – one of the founders of the movement. Only 14 years old, she accompanied her father throughout Sicily to help him setting up Fasci in the interior. She was "extraordinarily animated by the spirit of socialism, who spoke to the people with a fervour of a missionary, and because of her sex and age, she commanded the fascination of the masses."

The authorities watched the Fasci closely and in a report to the government in Rome noticed that the female Fasci in Piana, Belmonte Mezzagno and San Giuseppe Jato should be considered as dangerous. The women had developed "highly successful propaganda activities and revolutionary agendas, through which they exercised considerable influence on the other fasci in the region."

Mafia involvement 
Some historians emphasize that the leagues were engaged in class struggle against a coalition of landowners and mafiosi and ignore evidence of strategic alliances between the Fasci and the Mafia. The leagues were not only led by socialists and anarchists; some were run by local gentry and mafiosi. The Mafia bosses Vito Cascioferro and Nunzio Giaimo led the Fasci in Bisacquino in alliance with Verro. The Mafia was sometimes needed to enforce flying pickets with credible threats of violence and to make the strike costly to landowners by destroying their property.

In order to give the strike teeth and to protect himself from harm, Verro became a member of a Mafia group in Corleone, the Fratuzzi (Little Brothers). However, during the great strike of the Fasci in September 1893, the Fratuzzi mobilized to boycott it, providing the necessary manpower to work on the lands that the peasants refused to cultivate. After that, Verro broke away from the mafiosi, and – according to police reports – became their most bitter enemy. He was killed by the Mafia in 1915 when he was the mayor of Corleone.

In literature and film
 Luigi Pirandello's 1913 novel I vecchi e i giovani (The Old and the Young) retraces the history of the failure and repression of the Fasci Siciliani in the period from 1893-94. Although Pirandello was not an active member of this movement, he had close ties of friendship with some of its leading ideologists: Rosario Garibaldi Bosco, Enrico La Loggia, Giuseppe De Felice Giuffrida and Francesco De Luca.
 The film Il giorno di San Sebastiano (Saint Sebastian's Day) (1993), directed by Pasquale Scimeca, is based on the Caltavuturo massacre on January 20, 1893, when during the celebration of Saint Sebastian, a firing squad killed 15 peasants who claimed their right to state-owned land. It won a Golden Globe and was presented at the Venice film festival. The play, a monologue depicting a peasant woman whose husband was killed in the events at Caltavuturo, was written by Rosario Garibaldi Bosco and first performed on February 2, 1893, in Palermo to raise money for the victims.

References

Sources
Alcorn, John (2004). Revolutionary Mafiosi: Voice and Exit in the 1890s, in: Paolo Viola & Titti Morello (eds.), L’associazionismo a Corleone: Un’inchiesta storica e sociologica (Istituto Gramsci Siciliano, Palermo, 2004)
 Clark, Martin (2008). Modern Italy, 1871 to the present, Harlow: Pearson Education, 
 Cody, Gabrielle H. & Evert Sprinchorn (2007). The Columbia encyclopedia of modern drama, Volume 2, New York: Columbia University Press, 
  Colajanni, Napoleone (1895). Gli avvenimenti di Sicila e le loro cause, Palermo: Remo Sandron Editore
 Debouzy, Marianne (1992). In the Shadow of the Statue of Liberty: Immigrants, Workers, and Citizens in the American Republic, 1880-1920, Champaign (IL): University of Illinois Press, 
 De Grand, Alexander J. (2001). The hunchback's tailor: Giovanni Giolitti and liberal Italy from the challenge of mass politics to the rise of fascism, 1882-1922, Greenwood Publishing Group, 
 Duggan, Christopher (2008). The Force of Destiny: A History of Italy Since 1796, Houghton Mifflin Harcourt, 
 Guglielmo, Jennifer (2010). Living the Revolution: Italian Women's Resistance and Radicalism in New York City, 1880-1945, University of North Carolina Press, 
 Hobsbawm, Eric J. (1959/1971). Primitive rebels; studies in archaic forms of social movement in the 19th and 20th centuries, Manchester: Manchester University Press, 
  Leoni, Francesco (2001). Storia dei partiti politici italiani,  Naples: Guida Editori, 
  Renda, Francesco (1977). I fasci siciliani : 1892-94, Turin: Einaudi. 
  Scolaro, Gabriella (2008), Il movimento antimafia siciliano: Dai Fasci dei lavoratori all'omicidio di Carmelo Battaglia, Lulu.com, 
 Seton-Watson, Christopher (1967). Italy from liberalism to fascism, 1870-1925,  New York: Taylor & Francis, 

 
1891 in Italy
1892 in Italy
1893 in Italy
1894 in Italy
19th century in Sicily
Politics of Italy
Modern history of Italy
Socialism
Socialism in Italy
Syndicalism
Riots and civil disorder in Italy
Sicilian rebellions